This is a list of cartridges and cassettes for the Intellivision game system. Some cartridges were published by both Mattel Electronics and Sears Tele-Games, and later Intellivision Inc. Between 1979 and 1989, a total of 132 titles were released:
 118 cartridges plus one compilation cartridge for the Master Component 
 6 cartridges for the ECS Computer Adapter
 7 cassettes and 1 cartridge for the Keyboard Component

The main reference for this is the Game Catalog of IntellivisionLives.com. Some games were also published under different names when they were re-released as Intellivision Lives!.

Table Key 

All early games published by Mattel Electronics were categorized by "Network". Each network had its own color that was used for the game box. The network concept was abandoned in late 1982.

Master Component Releases 
Cartridges released during the production life of the Intellivision from 1979 to 1990.  Intellivoice cartridges are included here.  Although designed to be played with speech, the Intellivoice cartridges do run without the Intellivoice peripheral.

Entertainment Computer System Releases 
With one exception the following cartridges require the ECS Computer Adapter and either the Computer Keyboard or Music Synthesizer peripherals.

Keyboard Component Releases 
Keyboard Component cassettes had limited availability through direct mail or select markets. Only 4000 Keyboard Components were manufactured.

Unreleased 
A list of Intellivision games that are playable but not released.  Keyboard Component software on cassette tape are also included.  Technical demos, store demos, and test cartridges are not included.  Air Strike is one example that can be considered unfinished and is included in this list because the found prototype is playable.  Hypnotic Lights is excluded because it is mostly a technical demo.  Grid Shock is excluded due to lack of game play.  Some were not released due to marketing decisions, others were due to Mattel Electronics shutting down in January 1984.  Unless otherwise noted the reference source is the list of Unreleased Intellivision Games at IntellivisionLives.com.  

In a 2014 interview, APh programmer Tom Loughry explains that in 1982 he and another APh programmer started a third Advanced Dungeons & Dragons game which was abandoned when he left the company.  He also worked on a Keyboard Component cassette game Super Football whose completion status is unknown.  In a 2015 interview with Russ Haft, manager of the Intellivision programming group at Atari, it is explained that in addition to the four games released versions of Joust, Jungle Hunt, Pole Position, and Missile Command were completed or close to completion.  Missile Command would have been dropped because of poor playability.  A June 1983 press release from CBS Electronics announces Wizard of War and Gorf to be released in July and Blueprint, Solar Fox, and Omega Race cartridges for August.  This suggests Wizard of War and Gorf were completed and programming on the others were at least started.  Other announced games such as Imagic Wing War and Moonsweeper have little information about their status.

Tutorvision

Homebrew 
Games created by Intellivision fans and hobbyists.

Related 
 Lists of video games

References

External links

Intellivision